There were eight special elections to the United States House of Representatives in 1897 during the 55th United States Congress, which began on March 4, 1897.  None of the special elections in 1897 were during the 54th United States Congress, which ended March 3, 1897.

|-
! 
| James J. Davidson
|  | Republican
| 1896
|  | Member-elect died January 2, 1897, before the term.New member elected April 20, 1897.Republican hold.Successor seated May 3, 1897.
| nowrap | 

|-
! 
| Richard P. Giles
|  | Democratic
| 1896
|  | Member-elect died November 17, 1896, before the term.New member elected June 1, 1897.Democratic hold.Successor seated June 10, 1897.
| nowrap | 

|-
! 
| Seth L. Milliken
|  | Republican
| 1882
|  | Member-elect died April 18, 1897.New member elected June 21, 1897.Republican hold.Successor seated July 1, 1897.
| nowrap | 

|-
! 
| John L. McLaurin
|  | Democratic
| 1892 
|  | Incumbent resigned May 31, 1897, when appointed U.S. Senator.New member elected October 12, 1897.Successor seated December 6, 1897.Democratic hold.
| nowrap | 

|-
! 
| Ashley B. Wright
|  | Republican
| 1892
|  | Incumbent died August 14, 1897.New member elected November 2, 1897.Republican hold.Successor seated December 6, 1897.
| nowrap | 

|-
! 
| William S. Holman
|  | Democratic
| 18581864 18661876 18801894 1896
|  | Incumbent died April 22, 1897.New member elected August 10, 1897.Democratic hold.Successor seated December 6, 1897.
| nowrap | 

|-
! 
| Francis H. Wilson
|  | Republican
| 1894
|  | Incumbent resigned September 30, 1897, to become Postmaster of Brooklyn, New York.New member elected November 2, 1897.Democratic gain.Successor seated December 6, 1897.
| nowrap | 

|-
! 
| Edward D. Cooke
|  | Republican
| 1894
|  | Incumbent died June 24, 1897.New member elected November 23, 1897.Democratic gain.Successor seated December 6, 1897.
| nowrap | 

|}

See also 
 List of special elections to the United States House of Representatives

References 

 
 

 
1897